Burning Deck was a small press specializing in the publication of experimental poetry and prose. Burning Deck was founded by the writers Keith Waldrop and Rosmarie Waldrop in 1961 and closed in 2017.

Overview
Although the Waldrops initially promoted Burning Deck magazine as a "quinterly", after only four issues the periodical was transformed into a series of pamphlets. The transformation continued later until the press became a publisher of books of poetry and short fiction. 

The magazine published poets from different styles and schools. The main split in poets of that time was said to be the one between the "academics" and the "beats", but Burning Deck ignored that split to the point where authors sometimes complained of being published in the company of others so different from themselves. 

By 1985, the economics of publishing had changed and it became financially more feasible to print regular books on offset presses and use letterpress work for smaller chapbooks, something the Waldrops have noted in the history of the enterprise (Keith and Rosmarie Waldrop, Burning Deck: A History) they wrote and published together. The Waldrops continued to design and print books that are made to last (using smyth-sewn, acid-free paper) but tried to keep the price affordable.

Notable books
Although Burning Deck was a small, nonprofit press, it published works of innovative writing, including (alphabetical by author):

99: The New Meaning, by Walter Abish
A Geometry by Anne-Marie Albiach
Why Write? by Paul Auster
The Heat Bird, by Mei-mei Berssenbrugge
Utterances, by William Bronk
The Grand Hotels (of Joseph Cornell), by Robert Coover
Striking Resemblance by Tina Darragh
Species of Intoxication: Extracts from the Leaves of the Doctor Ordinaire by Michael Gizzi 
Artificial Heart, by Peter Gizzi
The Countess from Minneapolis, by Barbara Guest
Innocence in extremis by John Hawkes
My Life, by Lyn Hejinian
A Test of Solitude by Emmanuel Hocquard
Some Other Kind of Mission by Lisa Jarnot
Trial Impressions by Harry Mathews
i.e. by Claude Royet-Journoud
Numen, by Cole Swensen
The Windows Flew Open, by Marjorie Welish
Turneresque, by Elizabeth Willis

Translation
Burning Deck published two series of translation: Serie d'ecriture presented a new book of contemporary French poetry each year; Dichten= presented an annual volume of contemporary German writing.

Notes

Further reading

External links
The Burning Deck homepage
40 Year Anniversary Exhibit of Burning Deck materials at Brown University

Book publishing companies of the United States
Small press publishing companies
Alternative press
Poetry organizations
Publishing companies established in 1961
American companies established in 1961